Eric Chase (30 January 1931 – 19 July 1989) was a Guyanese cricketer. He played in one first-class match for British Guiana in 1951/52.

See also
 List of Guyanese representative cricketers

References

External links
 

1931 births
1989 deaths
Guyanese cricketers
Guyana cricketers